Ballore is a commune in the Saône-et-Loire department in the region of Bourgogne-Franche-Comté in eastern France.

Geography
The commune lies in the southwest of the department in the valley of the Loire.

The Arconce flows southwest through the commune.

Population

See also
Communes of the Saône-et-Loire department

References

Communes of Saône-et-Loire